Hugo Gutierrez Jr. (January 29, 1927 – June 12, 2013) was a Filipino jurist and civil liberties advocate. Gutierrez served as an Associate Justice of the Supreme Court of the Philippines May 14, 1982 - March 31, 1993.
He had to resign in disgrace because of plagiarism that dealt with the Supreme Court Case with Eastern Telecommunications Philippines v. PLDT Decision. This plagiarism was uncovered by a young attorney, Arthur Lim, who is now part of COMELEC.

He worked in the Office of the Solicitor General before joining the Supreme Court.

Gutierrez was appointed to the Supreme Court by President Ferdinand Marcos in 1982. He and his fellow Supreme Court justices resigned from the High Court following the People Power Revolution, which ousted Marcos and brought Corazon Aquino to power. Gutierrez was one of just three sitting justices who were reappointed to the Supreme Court by President Aquino following her reorganization of the court.

Gutierrez died from complications related to diabetes on June 12, 2013, at the age of 86. He was laid in state at the Sanctuarium on Araneta Avenue in Manila.

References

Associate Justices of the Supreme Court of the Philippines
Deaths from diabetes
1927 births
2013 deaths